The División de Honor Femenina 2018–19, or Liga Guerreras Iberdrola 2018-19 after sponsorship of Iberdrola, was the 62nd season of women's handball top flight in Spain since its establishment. The season began on 7 September. A total of 14 teams take part the league, 12 of which had already contested in the 2017–18 season, and two of which were promoted from the División de Plata 2017–18.

Promotion and relegation 
Teams promoted from 2017–18 División de Plata
CB Morvedre
Helvetia Alcobendas

Teams relegated to 2019–20 División de Plata
CB Morvedre
Canyamelar Valencia
BM Castellón

Teams

Final standings

Top goalscorers

See also
Liga ASOBAL 2018–19

References

External links
Royal Spanish Handball Federation

División de Honor Femenina de Balonmano seasons
Division de Honor
2018–19 domestic handball leagues
2018 in women's handball
2019 in women's handball